Funbag Animation Studios (also known as Funbag Studios or Funbag) was a Canadian animation studio headquartered in Ottawa, Ontario. It was well known for working on animated television series such as Undergrads, Freaky Stories, Toad Patrol, Watership Down, Anthony Ant, King, Mole Sisters, The Eggs, For Better or For Worse, Faireez, Seven Little Monsters, Madeline, and The Wiggles Show.

Funbag provided additional production services on projects such as The Simpsons, The Ren & Stimpy Show, Beavis and Butt-Head, Rupert, LazyTown, The Oz Kids, The Land Before Time V: The Mysterious Island, Sniz & Fondue, Freaky Stories, Captain Star, Birdz, Ace Ventura: Pet Detective, Wild C.A.T.s, The Lionhearts, The Ripping Friends, Ed, Edd n Eddy, Aaahh!!! Real Monsters, RoboRoach, The New Woody Woodpecker Show, The Oblongs, Mission Hill, Rainbow Fish, and Back to School with Franklin.

On April 29, 2007, the company closed due to a decline in business, and some of the employees at the studio founded New Bike Entertainment to secure Funbag's assets. Funbag also had an office in India.

Notes

Canadian animation studios
Mass media companies established in 1992
Mass media companies disestablished in 2007
Companies based in Ottawa